George Oliver Barclay (May 16, 1876 – April 3, 1909) was an American football and baseball player. He played Major League Baseball for the St. Louis Cardinals and later the Boston Beaneaters. He was also an early professional football player-coach for the Greensburg Athletic Association. He was nicknamed "The Rose" for his concern with his looks and "Deerfoot" because of his speed. Barclay also invented the first football helmet.

Baseball career

Minor leagues 
Barclay began his professional baseball career in 1896 with the Chambersburg Maroons in the independent Cumberland Valley League. He continued to play both football and minor league baseball. In 1901, he batted .335 for the Rochester Bronchos of the Eastern League, earning him a look from the Cardinals.

Cardinals 
Barclay was 25 years old when he broke into the big leagues on April 17, 1902, with the St. Louis Cardinals. Two of the team's starting outfielders, Jesse Burkett and Emmet Heidrick, had jumped to the rival St. Louis Browns of the new American League, and Barclay, along with Doc Smoot, were acquired to replace them, with Barclay becoming the everyday left fielder. Both men hit over .300 that year, as did their manager and outfield mate Patsy Donovan, but the Cardinals still fell from fourth to sixth.

In 1903, although Smoot continued to play well, Barclay's production fell off, batting just .248. Still, he was brought back to be the team's starting left fielder in 1904. His performance continued to decline, and he was batting just .200 when he was sold to the Boston Beaneaters on September 11, 1904, having been replaced by rookie Hugh Hill.

Beaneaters and return to the minors 
Barclay was moved to right field by the Beaneaters, and his average bounced back a bit to .226 during his time with Boston. He started the 1905 season back in left field, but after batting just .176 in 29 games he was replaced by Jim Delahanty and eventually released on May 22, 1905.

Barclay returned to Rochester to finish the 1905 season, but he never regained his previous level of performance, as he batted .245 that year, then just .190 in 1906. After one more season with the class-B Lynn Shoemakers of the New England League, batting .207 in 43 games, Barclay left professional baseball.

First football helmet and career 
Barclay was credited with inventing the first-ever football helmet in 1894, with the intention that it would prevent cauliflower ears. The helmet was constructed by a saddle-maker from nearby Easton with strips of leather harness padding. It attracted national attention in a Lafayette game against Penn on Oct. 24, 1896. The NCAA and the National Football League made helmets mandatory in 1939 and in 1941, respectively.

Barclay was a member of the 1896 Lafayette football team that won the national championship. The next year, he was a player-coach for the Greensburg Athletic Association. He ended the season on the player on that team named to the "All- Western Pennsylvania" team by the Pittsburgh Press. A year later, he was chosen by Dave Berry, the manager of the rival Latrobe Athletic Association, to play for the Western Pennsylvania All-Stars in the very first football all-star game, against the Duquesne Country and Athletic Club.

Death
Barclay died on April 3, 1909, at the Hospital of the University of Pennsylvania in Philadelphia. He succumbed to peritonitis after an operation for appendicitis. In 1984-85, Barclay was inducted into the Lafayette College Maroon Club Hall of Fame.

References

External links

1876 births
1909 deaths
19th-century players of American football
American football halfbacks
Major League Baseball left fielders
1898 Western Pennsylvania All-Star football players
Bucknell Bison football players
Boston Beaneaters players
Chambersburg Maroons players
Greensburg Athletic Association coaches
Greensburg Athletic Association players
Lafayette Leopards baseball players
Lafayette Leopards football coaches
Lafayette Leopards football players
Lynn Shoemakers players
Muhlenberg Mules football coaches
Rochester Bronchos players
Rochester Yellowjackets football coaches
St. Louis Cardinals players
Coaches of American football from Pennsylvania
Players of American football from Pennsylvania
Baseball players from Pennsylvania